Wùlu, the Malian Scarface is a 2016 Malian crime drama film directed by Marseille-born French-Malian director Daouda Coulibaly and co-produced by Éric Névé and Oumar Sy. The film stars Ibrahim Koma and Inna Modja with Quim Gutiérrez, Olivier Rabourdin, and Ndiaye Ismaël in supporting roles. The film is about Ladji, a 20-year-old van driver in Mali who becomes a West African drug lord during the 2012 Mali War. He started committing crimes so that his older sister could quit working as a prostitute.

The film received critics acclaim and screened worldwide. The film premiered at the 2016 Angouleme Film Festival. The next year, lead actor Ibrahim Koma won the Best Actor Award at FESPACO 2017.

Originally the shooting was planned in Mali, but later relocated to Senegal for security reasons after the Bamako attack occurred in November 2015. Then the film was shot in Thiès, Senegal.

Cast
 Ibrahim Koma as Ladji
 Inna Modja as Aminata
 Quim Gutiérrez as Rafael
 Olivier Rabourdin as Jean-François
 Ndiaye Ismaël as Zol
 Habib Dembélé as Issiaka
 Jean-Marie Traoré as Houphouët
 Ndiaye Mariame as Assitan

References

External links 
 

Malian drama films
2016 films
2016 crime drama films
African crime films
Films set in Mali
Films set in Senegal
Films shot in Senegal
French drama films
Senegalese drama films
2010s French films